Falaj or Falj may refer to:
 Falj, Zanjan

Falaj (Arabic: فلج) refers to:

 Falaj, irrigation system